Nidamangalam Junction (station code: NMJ) is a junction railway station serving Needamangalam in Tamil Nadu, India.

The station is a part of the Tiruchirappalli railway division of the Southern Railway zone and connects the city to various parts of the state as well as the rest of the country.

Location and layout

Lines
The station connects Chennai Egmore, Thanjavur Junction, Tiruchchirappalli Junction, Rameswaram, etc.

 BG single line towards Nagapattinam Junction via Koradacheri.
 BG single line towards  via Saliyamangalam.
 BG single line towards Mannargudi

References

Trichy railway division
Railway stations in Thiruvarur district
Railway junction stations in Tamil Nadu